Tersias is the second sequel to the fantasy novel Shadowmancer by Graham P. Taylor and direct sequel to Wormwood. Tersias was followed in 2006 by The Shadowmancer Returns: The Curse of Salamander Street. Tersias has had two releases, one for the original copy and a second for a special edition version.

Plot summary 
The story starts off after Wormwood was destroyed and was sent to the dark side of the moon. Just as London was starting to recover from the disaster, Malachi, a magician, kept a blind boy named Tersias. Tersias was the one that predicted the coming of the comet for he was an oracle. After some time, people began to know about the helpless child's "abilities". Many people wanted to use Tersias' powers for themselves: Malachi, himself; Jonah, a teenage highwayman and his partner, Tara; Solomon, a zealot, who plans on using his experiments (flesh-eating locusts) and Lord Malphas, a keeper of mysterious powers. 
 

Children's fantasy novels
2005 British novels
2005 children's books
British children's novels
Faber and Faber books